Lawrence Turman (born November 28, 1926) is an American former film producer.

Early life
Turman was born to a Jewish family.

Career
Turman was nominated for an Academy Award for The Graduate (1967). He has also produced such films as Pretty Poison (1968), The Great White Hope (1970), The Thing (1982), Mass Appeal (1984), Short Circuit (1986), The River Wild (1994), and American History X (1998).

He has also directed two films: The Marriage of a Young Stockbroker (1971) and Second Thoughts (1983).

He was co-partner on The Turman/Foster Company with David Foster, which was established in 1972, to make theatrical films, which was increasingly prominent in television production, in order to eye on television movies, and planned work on series, and eyeing television sales, and the company ran under contract to Warner Bros., developing their failed television pilots, like Mass Appeal.

Turman is a member of the Producers Guild Hall of Fame, and is on the board of the Producers Branch of the Academy of Motion Picture Arts and Sciences. He currently serves as the director of The Peter Stark Producing Program at the University of Southern California.

Turman published the book So You Want to be a Producer with Three Rivers Press in 2005.

In 2014, he appeared as a guest critic on the fourth season of the web series On Cinema. In 2015, he appeared as himself in ESPN's 30 for 30 documentary Trojan War.

Filmography

 The Young Doctors (1961)
 I Could Go On Singing (1963)
 Stolen Hours (1963)
 The Best Man (1964)
 The Flim-Flam Man (1967)
 The Graduate (1967)
 Pretty Poison (1968)
 The Flim-Flam Man (1969) (TV)
 The Great White Hope (1970)
 The Marriage of a Young Stockbroker (1971) (also director)
 She Lives! (1973) (TV)
 Get Christie Love! (1973) (TV)
 The Morning After (1974) (TV)
 Unwed Father (1974) (TV)
 The Nickel Ride (1974)
 The Drowning Pool (1975)
 Heroes (1977)
 First Love (1977)
 Walk Proud (1979)
 Caveman (1981)
 Between Two Brothers (1982) (TV)
 The Gift of Life (1982) (TV)
 The Thing (1982)
 Second Thoughts (1983) (also director)
 Mass Appeal (1984)
 The Mean Season (1985)
 News at Eleven (1986) (TV)
 Short Circuit (1986)
 Running Scared (1986)
 Short Circuit 2 (1988)
 Full Moon in Blue Water (1988)
 Gleaming the Cube (1989)
 The Getaway (1994)
 The River Wild (1994)
 Pretty Poison (1996) (TV)
 Booty Call (1997)
 The Long Way Home (1997) (TV)
 American History X (1998)
 Miracle on the Mountain: The Kincaid Family Story (2000) (TV)
 Kingdom Come (2001)
 What's the Worst That Could Happen? (2001)
 The Thing (2011)

References

External links

Living people
1926 births
20th-century American Jews
Film producers from California
Businesspeople from Los Angeles
Film directors from Los Angeles
20th-century American businesspeople
21st-century American businesspeople
USC Gould School of Law faculty
21st-century American Jews